The Garrick Year is the second novel by British novelist Margaret Drabble, first published in 1964. It is a first-person account of Emma, a London wife and mother examining the fraught bits of her marriage and an affair.

Development
Drabble wrote the novel while living in Stratford-upon-Avon, the birthplace of William Shakespeare, thus The Garrick Year focuses significantly on a satirical treatment of the theatre and actors.

Reception
Kirkus Reviews deemed the novel better than Drabble's debut novel, A Summer Bird-Cage.

Reception

1964 British novels
Novels about actors
Novels by Margaret Drabble
Novels set in Herefordshire
Weidenfeld & Nicolson books